Khalkotauroi also known as the Colchis Bulls are mythical creatures that appear in the Greek myth of Jason and the Golden Fleece.

Mythology
The Khalkotauroi are two immense bulls with bronze hooves and bronze mouths through which they breathe fire. In the Argonautica, Jason is promised the prized fleece by King Aeetes if he can first yoke the Khalkotauroi and use them to plough a field. The field is then to be sown with dragon's teeth.

Jason survives the burning flames of the bronze bulls by rubbing on his body a magical potion that protects him from the heat. The potion has been provided by Medea, King Aeetes' own daughter, who has fallen in love with Jason.

The Khalkotauroi were a gift to King Aeetes from the Greek gods' blacksmith, Hephaestus.

He Hephaistos had also made for him Aeetes king of Kolkhis Bulls with feet of bronze the Khalkotauroi and bronze mouths from which the breath came out in flame, blazing and terrible. And he had forged a plough of indurated steel, all in one piece.
—Apollonius Rhodius, Argonautica 3.215

In popular culture
 Nick Willing's version of Jason and the Argonauts features a creature known as the Menaian Bull, a somewhat part-bull part-machine, which Jason has to tame. This version, however, does breathe fire and is used to plow the fields by Jason. The sown dragon's teeth grow into armoured skeletons.
 The Khalkotauroi appear in the second Percy Jackson & the Olympians novel The Sea of Monsters. The bulls are described to be elephant-sized, fire-breathing bronze bulls created by Hephaestus with horns of silver and rubies for eyes. They attack Camp Half-Blood before being subdued by Percy Jackson's cyclops half-brother Tyson. The Khalkotauroi were later used to make the tracks for the Chariot Race. In the film adaptation of the book only one Colchis Bull appears and is fully mechanical in nature, being defeated when Percy uses his sword to jam the bull's internal gears.

See also
 List of Greek mythological creatures

Notes

References 
Automata in Greek Mythology
Mythological bovines
Mythological bulls
Characters in the Argonautica
Fire-breathing monsters

 Apollonius Rhodius, Argonautica translated by Robert Cooper Seaton (1853-1915), R. C. Loeb Classical Library Volume 001. London, William Heinemann Ltd, 1912. Online version at the Topos Text Project.
 Apollonius Rhodius, Argonautica. George W. Mooney. London. Longmans, Green. 1912. Greek text available at the Perseus Digital Library.